was a Japanese jurist noted for his contributions to the law of civil procedure.

Kaneko was appointed professor at the University of Tokyo in 1931, and left the chair in 1950 to practice law. His writings contributed to the dogmatic structure of civil procedure, and his textbook  (1954) was very influential in teaching and legal practice.

References

1906 births
1973 deaths
Academic staff of the University of Tokyo
Japanese jurists